Roger Oliver Knight (born October 11, 1978) is a former American football linebacker in the National Football League (NFL).  He would attend Brooklyn Technical High School, graduating in 1997. He was drafted by the Pittsburgh Steelers in the sixth round of the 2001 NFL Draft. He played college football at Wisconsin.

Knight also played for the New Orleans Saints.

References

1978 births
Living people
American football linebackers
Wisconsin Badgers football players
New Orleans Saints players